Pál Várhidi (born Pál Vinkovics; 6 November 1931 – 12 November 2015) was a Hungarian football player and a manager.

Playing career

Club
He played for Újpesti Dózsa as a defender and helped the club win the Hungarian League in 1959/60. He was born in Újpest.

International
Between 1954 and 1957 Várhidi played 10 times for Hungary and he represented his country in 1 FIFA World Cup qualification match. The fringe member of the Mighty Magyars also took part in the 1954 World Cup but didn't play any games. He is most famous for his participation in the bronze medal-winning Hungarian team on the 1960 Summer Olympic Games.

Managerial career
After his playing career, Várhidi became a successful coach, leading Újpest to 4 championship titles between 1974 and 1980, and the European Cup semi-final in 1974. As a professional player and first division coach he only played and worked for Újpest. He died in 2015 at the age of 84.

His son, Péter Várhidi was the coach of the Hungarian national team from 2006 to 2008.

References

External links
 
 Obituary - UEFA
 

Hungarian footballers
1954 FIFA World Cup players
1931 births
2015 deaths
Hungary international footballers
Újpest FC players
Hungarian football managers
Újpest FC managers
Olympic footballers of Hungary
Footballers at the 1960 Summer Olympics
Olympic bronze medalists for Hungary
People from Újpest
Olympic medalists in football
Medalists at the 1960 Summer Olympics
Association football defenders
Nemzeti Bajnokság I managers